F. M. Long was a college basketball and track and field coach. 

He served as head coach for LSU basketball for two seasons from 1911 to 1913. Long had an overall record of 6–9. He had a 4–6 record (2–3 SIAA) record during the 1911–1912 season and 2–3 (1–3 SIAA) record during the 1912–13 season. 

Long was also head coach of the LSU Tigers track and field team in 1912.

References

College men's basketball head coaches in the United States
College track and field coaches in the United States
LSU Tigers basketball coaches
LSU Tigers and Lady Tigers track and field coaches